The godwits  are a group of large, long-billed, long-legged and strongly migratory waders of the bird genus Limosa. Their long bills allow them to probe deeply in the sand for aquatic worms and molluscs. In their winter range, they flock together where food is plentiful. They frequent tidal shorelines, breeding in northern climates in summer and migrating south in winter. A female bar-tailed godwit made a flight of 29,000 km (18,000 mi), flying  of it without stopping. In 2020 a male bar-tailed godwit flew about  non-stop in its migration from Alaska to New Zealand, previously a record for avian non-stop flight.

The godwits can be distinguished from the curlews by their straight or slightly upturned bills, and from the dowitchers by their longer legs. The winter plumages are fairly drab, but three species have reddish underparts when breeding. The females are appreciably larger than the males.

Godwits were once a popular British dish.  Sir Thomas Browne writing in about 1682 noted that godwits "were accounted the daintiest dish in England".

Taxonomy
The genus Limosa was introduced by the French zoologist Mathurin Jacques Brisson in 1760 with the black-tailed godwit (Limosa limosa) as the type species. The genus name Limosa is from Latin and means "muddy", from limus, "mud". The English name "godwit" was first recorded in about 1416–17 and is believed to imitate the bird's call.

The genus contains four living species:

 Bar-tailed godwit, Limosa lapponica
 Black-tailed godwit, Limosa limosa
 Hudsonian godwit, Limosa haemastica
 Marbled godwit, Limosa fedoa

Fossil species
In addition, there are two or three species of fossil prehistoric godwits. Limosa vanrossemi is known from the Monterey Formation (Late Miocene, approx. 6 mya) of Lompoc, United States. Limosa lacrimosa is known from the Early Pliocene of Western Mongolia (Kurochkin, 1985). Limosa gypsorum of the Late Eocene (Montmartre Formation, some 35 mya) of France may have actually been a curlew or some bird ancestral to both curlews and godwits (and possibly other Scolopacidae), or even a rail, being placed in the monotypic genus Montirallus by some (Olson, 1985). Certainly, curlews and godwits are rather ancient and in some respects primitive lineages of scolopacids, further complicating the assignment of such possibly basal forms.

In a 2001 study comparing the ratios cerebrum to brain volumes in various dinosaur species, Hans C. E. Larsson found that more derived dinosaurs generally had proportionally more voluminous cerebrum. Limosa gypsorum, then regarded as a Numenius species, was a discrepancy in this general trend. L. gypsorum was only 63% of the way between a typical reptilian ratio and that of modern birds. However, this may be explainable if the endocast was distorted, as it had been previously depicted in the past by Deschaseaux, who is described by Larsson as calling the endocast "slightly anteroposteriorly sheared and laterally compressed."

Citations

General sources 
 
 Larsson, H. C. E. 2001. Endocranial anatomy of Carcharodontosaurus saharicus (Theropoda: Allosauroidea) and its implications for theropod brain evolution. pp. 19–33. In: Mesozoic Vertebrate Life. Tanke, D. H., Carpenter, K., Skrepnick, M. W. (eds.). Indiana University Press.
 Olson, Storrs L. (1985): Section X.D.2.b. "Scolopacidae". In: Farner, D.S.; King, J.R. & Parkes, Kenneth C. (eds.): Avian Biology 8: 174–175. Academic Press, New York.

Taxa named by Mathurin Jacques Brisson